Penmaen Halt railway station served the hamlet of Penmaen, in the historical county of Monmouthshire, Wales, from 1927 to 1939 on the Penar branch line.

History
The station was opened on 14 March 1927 by the Great Western Railway. It closed on 25 September 1939.

References

Disused railway stations in Caerphilly County Borough
History of Monmouthshire
Former Great Western Railway stations
Railway stations in Great Britain opened in 1927
Railway stations in Great Britain closed in 1939
1927 establishments in Wales
1939 disestablishments in Wales